The 1962 Holy Cross Crusaders baseball team represented the College of the Holy Cross in the 1962 NCAA University Division baseball season. The Crusaders played their home games at Fitton Field. The team was coached by Albert Riopel in his 2nd year as head coach at Holy Cross.

The Crusaders won the District I playoff to advance to the College World Series, where they were defeated by the Santa Clara Broncos.

Roster

Schedule

|-
! style="" | Regular Season
|-

|-
! bgcolor="#DDDDFF" width="3%" | #
! bgcolor="#DDDDFF" width="7%" | Date
! bgcolor="#DDDDFF" width="14%" | Opponent
! bgcolor="#DDDDFF" width="25%" | Site/Stadium
! bgcolor="#DDDDFF" width="5%" | Score
! bgcolor="#DDDDFF" width="5%" | Overall Record
|- align="center" bgcolor="#ccffcc"
| 1 || April  ||  || Unknown • Unknown || 18–0 || 1–0
|- align="center" bgcolor="#ccffcc"
| 2 || April  ||  || Unknown • Unknown || 4–2 || 2–0
|- align="center" bgcolor="#ccffcc"
| 3 || April  ||  || Unknown • Unknown || 6–4 || 2–0
|- align="center" bgcolor="#ccffcc"
| 4 || April 26 ||  || Fitton Field • Worcester, Massachusetts || 6–1 || 4–0
|- align="center" bgcolor="#ffcccc"
| 5 || April 28 || Ithaca || Fitton Field • Worcester, Massachusetts || 6–7 || 4–1
|-

|-
! bgcolor="#DDDDFF" width="3%" | #
! bgcolor="#DDDDFF" width="7%" | Date
! bgcolor="#DDDDFF" width="14%" | Opponent
! bgcolor="#DDDDFF" width="25%" | Site/Stadium
! bgcolor="#DDDDFF" width="5%" | Score
! bgcolor="#DDDDFF" width="5%" | Overall Record
|- align="center" bgcolor="#ccffcc"
| 6 || May  ||  || Unknown • Unknown || 6–5 || 5–1
|- align="center" bgcolor="#ffcccc"
| 7 || May 4 ||  || Unknown • Unknown || 2–8 || 5–2
|- align="center" bgcolor="#ccffcc"
| 8 || May  ||  || Unknown • Unknown || 11–4 || 6–2
|- align="center" bgcolor="#ccffcc"
| 9 || May 8 ||  || Fitton Field • Worcester, Massachusetts || 3–2 || 7–2
|- align="center" bgcolor="#ccffcc"
| 10 || May  || Providence || Unknown • Unknown || 11–3 || 8–2
|- align="center" bgcolor="#ccffcc"
| 11 || May  ||  || Unknown • Unknown || 10–9 || 9–2
|- align="center" bgcolor="#ccffcc"
| 12 || May 16 ||  || Fitton Field • Worcester, Massachusetts || 7–4 || 10–2
|- align="center" bgcolor="#ccffcc"
| 13 || May 19 || at Dartmouth || Red Rolfe Field • Hanover, New Hampshire || 14–4 || 11–2
|- align="center" bgcolor="#ccffcc"
| 14 || May  ||  || Unknown • Unknown || 20–0 || 12–2
|- align="center" bgcolor="#ccffcc"
| 15 || May 26 ||  || Fitton Field • Worcester, Massachusetts || 15–7 || 13–2
|- align="center" bgcolor="#ffcccc"
| 16 || May 30 ||  || Fitton Field • Worcester, Massachusetts || 4–9 || 13–3
|- align="center" bgcolor="#ccffcc"
| 17 || May 31 ||  || Unknown • Unknown || 8–7 || 14–3
|-

|-
! bgcolor="#DDDDFF" width="3%" | #
! bgcolor="#DDDDFF" width="7%" | Date
! bgcolor="#DDDDFF" width="14%" | Opponent
! bgcolor="#DDDDFF" width="25%" | Site/Stadium
! bgcolor="#DDDDFF" width="5%" | Score
! bgcolor="#DDDDFF" width="5%" | Overall Record
|- align="center" bgcolor="#ccffcc"
| 18 || June 1 ||  || Unknown • Unknown || 15–5 || 15–3
|- align="center" bgcolor="#ccffcc"
| 19 || June 2 || at Boston College || John Shea Field • Chestnut Hill, Massachusetts || 10–1 || 16–3
|-

|-
! style="" | Postseason
|-

|-
! bgcolor="#DDDDFF" width="3%" | #
! bgcolor="#DDDDFF" width="7%" | Date
! bgcolor="#DDDDFF" width="14%" | Opponent
! bgcolor="#DDDDFF" width="25%" | Site/Stadium
! bgcolor="#DDDDFF" width="5%" | Score
! bgcolor="#DDDDFF" width="5%" | Overall Record
|- align="center" bgcolor="#ccffcc"
| 20 || June  || vs  || Unknown • Springfield, Massachusetts || 7–5 || 17–3
|- align="center" bgcolor="#ccffcc"
| 21 || June  || vs  || Unknown • Springfield, Massachusetts || 5–2 || 18–3
|- align="center" bgcolor="#ccffcc"
| 22 || June  || vs Vermont || Unknown • Springfield, Massachusetts || 12–5 || 19–3
|-

|-
! bgcolor="#DDDDFF" width="3%" | #
! bgcolor="#DDDDFF" width="7%" | Date
! bgcolor="#DDDDFF" width="14%" | Opponent
! bgcolor="#DDDDFF" width="25%" | Site/Stadium
! bgcolor="#DDDDFF" width="5%" | Score
! bgcolor="#DDDDFF" width="5%" | Overall Record
|- align="center" bgcolor="#ccffcc"
| 23 || June 9 || Boston College || Fitton Field • Worcester, Massachusetts || 4–2 || 20–3
|-

|-
! bgcolor="#DDDDFF" width="3%" | #
! bgcolor="#DDDDFF" width="7%" | Date
! bgcolor="#DDDDFF" width="14%" | Opponent
! bgcolor="#DDDDFF" width="25%" | Site/Stadium
! bgcolor="#DDDDFF" width="5%" | Score
! bgcolor="#DDDDFF" width="5%" | Overall Record
|- align="center" bgcolor="#ccffcc"
| 24 || June 11 || vs Colorado State College || Omaha Municipal Stadium • Omaha, Nebraska || 4–3 || 21–3
|- align="center" bgcolor="#ffcccc"
| 25 || June 12 || vs Michigan || Omaha Municipal Stadium • Omaha, Nebraska || 4–11 || 21–4
|- align="center" bgcolor="#ffcccc"
| 26 || June 13 || vs Santa Clara || Omaha Municipal Stadium • Omaha, Nebraska || 7–12 || 21–5
|-

|-
|

References

Holy Cross Crusaders baseball seasons
Holy Cross Crusaders baseball
College World Series seasons
Holy Cross